Notoplatynus is a genus of ground beetles in the family Carabidae. There are at least two described species in Notoplatynus, found in Australia.

Species
These two species belong to the genus Notoplatynus:
 Notoplatynus darlingtoni B.Moore, 1985
 Notoplatynus hilaris (Olliff, 1889)

References

Platyninae